Alessandro Mascia (born 6 August 1986 in Italy) is an Italian retired footballer.

Career

In 2007, Mascia signed for S.E.F. Torres 1903 in the professional Italian forth division, feeling like he was "touching the sky with my finger”. However, at the end of 2007/08, the club went bankrupt.

For 2012, he signed for FK Tauras Tauragė in the Lithuanian top flight from the Italian fifth division. Afterwards, Mascia said that football in Lithuania was "a completely different kind of football, physical and not tactical".

After playing for US San Teodoro, he received offers from the Italian fourth division but chose instead to play in the amateur seventh division.

References

External links
 

Italian footballers
Living people
1986 births
Association football midfielders